The Whitewater Valley Conference was an IHSAA-sanctioned conference based in Fayette, Franklin, Union, and later Henry and Wayne counties in East Central Indiana. The conference was founded in 1940 as a merger of the Franklin County Conference and Union County Conference, though because two of the FCC schools were not able to play a full conference schedule in the 1940-41 school year, two Fayette County Conference schools were added. The conference's last season was in 1967-68, as the consolidation wave of the 1950s and 1960s would leave the conference with three schools and no suitable replacements in the area, as Lewisville and Straughn became part of Tri in 1968. College Corner, whose location on the border of Indiana and Ohio allowed them to play in both the WVC and the Preble County League in Ohio, would continue to play in the PCL until joining with Short in Liberty to form Union County High School in 1974. Whitewater Township would merge into Brookville that same year. Laurel struggled on as an independent for two decades, as they were too far from the two conferences in the general region that featured schools of a similar size and sports offering, the Mid-Hoosier and Ohio River Valley conferences. The school eventually consolidated with Brookville to form Franklin County High School in 1989.

Membership

 Alquina and Harrisburg played concurrently in the WVC and FCC 1940-58.
 Brookville and Springfield Township played concurrently in the WVC and FCC 1940-41.
 College Corner played in both the WVC and Ohio's Preble County League throughout the WVC's existence. When the WVC folded, they remained in the PCL until consolidating into Union County in 1974.
 Liberty played concurrently in the WVC and the ECC from 1947 to 1962.

Membership timeline

References

Indiana high school athletic conferences
High school sports conferences and leagues in the United States
Indiana High School Athletic Association disestablished conferences